Korshiv is a village in the Lutsk Raion (district) of Volyn Oblast (province) of western Ukraine.

Before World War II this village belonged to Poland and its name was Korszów. This place lies near the northern scarp of the Volhynia Upland covered with loess. The loess profile exposed and studied in the Korszów village contains the best known, very typical example of the pedocomplex consisting of two paleosols from the Lublin Interglacial (210,000 - 230,000 BP). That is why this pedocomplex was named Korshov, and this name was used in the Ukrainian scientific literature for the first time by Andrey Bogutsky from the National University in L’viv.

External links 
Studia Quaternaria

Villages in Lutsk Raion